Doubled in Diamonds is a 1966 spy thriller novel by the British Victor Canning. It is the second in a series of four novels about Rex Carver, a private detective drawn back into his old profession of espionage.

Synopsis
Carver is hired to find a man who has failed to claim an inheritance, who is turns out has been involved in a diamond heist. His mission takes him to Dublin and France, and draws him into a plot overseen by two Chinese twins, who are agents of the communist government, to sell drugs and earn hard currency for their country.

References

Bibliography
 Burton, Alan. Historical Dictionary of British Spy Fiction. Rowman & Littlefield, 2016.
Murphy, Bruce F. The Encyclopedia of Murder and Mystery. Springer, 1999.
 Reilly, John M. Twentieth Century Crime & Mystery Writers. Springer, 2015.

1966 British novels
British spy novels
British thriller novels
Novels by Victor Canning
Novels set in London
Novels set in Ireland
Novels set in France
Heinemann (publisher) books
British crime novels